The WVU Reed College of Media is one of the sixteen colleges and schools at West Virginia University, located in Morgantown, West Virginia. It is currently housed in Martin Hall.

History
The WVU Reed College of Media was formerly known as the WVU P.I. Reed School of Journalism until July 1, 2014. It was created by Dr. Perley Isaac Reed. Dr. Reed arrived at West Virginia University in 1920 and was assigned to teach English and Journalism courses at the College of the Arts and Sciences. Soon, Reed made it his personal mission to expand the course load, which also included journalism history, editing, advertisement writing and trade and industrial journalism, in just a few years.

To gain further momentum, Reed used his involvement in the West Virginia State Newspaper Council to improve the press and its profitability. Using their political power they applied pressure and in the year 1927, Journalism became a department and later became a school in 1939.

The school did not have a building to call its home until 1953 when Martin Hall was given to the Journalism school. Prior to that, it had occupied only several rooms nearby in Woodburn Hall.

Location
West Virginia University's Reed College of Media, has been located in Martin Hall since 1954. Although the College only began its stay at Martin Hall fifty four years ago, Martin Hall has been part of Woodburn Circle for decades longer.

On June 16, 1869, an assembly of people gathered on the property that would ultimately be used to build West Virginia University's first new building. It took only $16,000 that was raised through the sale of the Monongalia Academy building, to build Martin Hall. 

In 1870, Martin Hall was erected by West Virginia University specifically for the use of students and faculty. It holds the distinction of being the oldest academic building on the West Virginia University campus.

Martin was modeled after French architecture. The roof slopes down at the sides and is flattened at the top which comes from the idea of a “Mansard roof” which is a style that originated in Paris, France.

The original hall built in 1870 looks much like it does today with only minor rehabilitation to improve the inside. In 1911, the clock that was located in a tower at the top of Martin was removed and placed on top of Woodburn hall, where it has remained the focal point of Woodburn Circle for almost one hundred years.

Throughout 1977-1978, Martin Hall underwent rehabilitation and a large addition was built onto the side of the building.

Clubs
The WVU Reed College of Media offers a variety of clubs. Each club is student-run and is sponsored by a faculty member from the College of Media.

Advertising Club:

Ad Club Awards 
 1997—WVU Ad Club 1st Place in 5th district of the AAF National Student Advertising Competition
 2004—WVU Ad Club 2nd Place in 5th district of the AAF National Student Advertising Competition

All Things Magazine:

Public Relations Student Society of America (PRSSA): The WVU chapter of PRSSA participates every year in the national conference and the Bateman Case Study Competition where they coordinate affairs for a student-run organization and design public relations campaigns.

Society of Professional Journalists (SPJ):

Name change
On February 21, 2014, the Perley Isaac Reed School of Journalism announced that on July 1 its name will be changed to the Reed College of Media.

References

External links
 The Daily Athenaeum student paper
 http://u92.wvu.edu/
 http://wvudownloads.wvu.edu/podcasts

Sources
 West Virginia University Official school site
 Atkins, Paul A.  The First 50 Years: Journalism at WVU. Morgantown:, 1977.
 Struyk, Tara. "Martin Hall."
 Ravesloot, Todd. "Campus' Oldest Academic Building to Receive Major Upgrades this Summer." Facilities Management News: Spring, 2008.
 WVU Perley Isaac Reed School of Journalism. Ed. Kimberly Brown, Morgantown, 2007.

Journalism schools in the United States
West Virginia University
1939 establishments in West Virginia